Shannon Creek is a short tributary to the Baker River in Whatcom County, Washington, near the southwest border of North Cascades National Park. Roughly halfway through its length, the two forks join and then flow into Baker Lake reservoir, at elevation . Shannon Creek joins the Baker several miles downstream of Sulphide Creek and upstream of Swift Creek, a much larger south-flowing drainage.

See also
List of rivers of Washington

References

Rivers of Washington (state)
North Cascades of Washington (state)
Rivers of Whatcom County, Washington